The 1990 South American Cross Country Championships took place on February 11, 1990.  The races were held in Caracas, Venezuela.

Complete results, results for junior and youth competitions, and medal winners were published.

Medallists

Race results

Senior men's race (12 km)

Junior (U20) men's race (8 km)

Senior women's race (8 km)

Junior (U20) women's race (6 km)

Medal table (unofficial)

Participation
According to an unofficial count, 26 athletes from 3 countries participated.

 (5)
 (9)
 (12)

See also
 1990 in athletics (track and field)

References

External links
 GBRathletics

South American Cross Country Championships
South American Cross Country Championships
South American Cross Country Championships
International athletics competitions hosted by Venezuela
Cross country running in Venezuela
February 1990 sports events in South America